The 22949/22950 Bandra Terminus–Delhi Sarai Rohilla Express is a Superfast train belonging to Indian Railways – Western Railway zone that runs between  and  in India.

It operates as train number 22949 from Bandra Terminus to Delhi Sarai Rohilla and as train number 22950 in the reverse direction, serving the states of Maharashtra, Gujarat, Rajasthan, Haryana & Delhi.

Coaches

The train has standard LHB rakes with max speed of 130 km/h. The train consists of 20 coaches:

 1 AC First cum AC II Tier
 2 AC II Tier
 6 AC III Tier
 8 Sleeper coaches
 3 General Unreserved
 1 End-on Generator
 1 Seating cum Luggage Rake 

As with most train services in India, coach composition may be amended at the discretion of Indian Railways depending on demand.

Service

 22949  Bandra Terminus–Delhi Sarai Rohilla Express covers the distance of 1345 kilometres in 24 hours 25 mins (55 km/hr).
 22950 Delhi Sarai Rohilla–Bandra Terminus Express covers the distance of 1345 kilometres in 24 hours 25 mins (55 km/hr).

As the average speed of the train is around 55 km/hr, as per Indian Railways rules, its fare includes a Superfast surcharge.

Route and halts

The important halts of the train are:

Schedule

Rake sharing

The train shares its rake with 19027/19028 Bandra Terminus–Jammu Tawi Vivek Express.

Traction

External links

References 

Express trains in India
Rail transport in Maharashtra
Rail transport in Gujarat
Rail transport in Rajasthan
Rail transport in Haryana
Delhi–Mumbai trains
Railway services introduced in 2012